Jacques Sauvageot (April 16, 1943 in Dijon – October 28, 2017 in Paris) was a French politician and art historian.

He was, along with Alain Geismar and Daniel Cohn-Bendit, was one of the spokespersons for the period of May 68, the name given to all the revolt movements that occurred in France during May–June 1968. He was later vice-president of the National Union of students of France (UNEF). He was elected president in December 1968 and chaired it until May 1969.

Biography
In May 1968, twenty-five year old Sauvageot was an active student union activist. He had already graduated with degrees in law and art history in Dijon. He was a member of the student branch of the Unified Socialist Party (PSU), and vice-president of UNEF, de facto exercising the role of president without having the title. In July 1967, he participated with Alain Krivine in an internship organized by students from the new University of Nanterre in the rural site of the Lycée Saint-Joseph de Bressuire in Deux-Sèvres.

On April 27, 1968, he held a press conference and said that the UNEF refused to give an order to boycott the exams.

The UNEF subsequently played a leading role in the junction of the labor and student movements during the great demonstration of the May 13, 1968 and the May 27 during the rally at Charléty stadium of the non-communist protestor left.

The May 3, he was arrested, among several hundred students, during the first night of revolt in the Latin Quarter. His notoriety grew rapidly, and he therefore played, notably with Alain Geismar and Daniel Cohn-Bendit, an important role in the expression of demands and the organization of the movement. On May 13, he is, along with the other union leaders, at the head of the Parisian demonstration which brings together several hundred thousand people.

In July, the UNEF made a first assessment of the events and wondered about the continuation of the movement. In December of the same year 1968, during the Marseille congress, the student organization, although divided between several tendencies, elected Jacques Sauvageot as its president.

In 1971, he was outvoted and left the union. He then militated in the PSU, more precisely in the Workers' and Peasant Left, a tendency of the PSU which broke away from this party in 1973 to merge with other small organizations within the Communist Organization of Workers. In 1976, he abandoned this activism which he described as "a small group of more".

He did his military service at Solenzara Air Base, then, being refused all the jobs to which he applied, became a specialized worker.

In 1973, he replied to a newspaper which had stated that he refused all the positions offered: "I have never yet had the possibility of refusing any position whatsoever: the many requests I have made in the education as in the public service or in the private sector have always met with a refusal." He then specifies that the only job he has found is carrying out, as a temporary worker, surveys on breeding in agriculture.

Following a competition, he entered the School of Fine Arts in Nantes as a professor of art history.

From 1983 to October 2009, he was director of the regional school of fine arts in Rennes. Between 2006 and 2009, he was president of the National Association of Higher Art Schools. He is also a member of the Socialist Tribune Institute which manages the PSU archives. It now bears his name. He is the author or co-author of several books on the art and ideas inherited from May 1968. In 2013, he led the publication of The PSU: Ideas for a socialism of the 21st century? (Rennes University Press). He occasionally collaborated with the Gabriel-Péri Foundation.

He then participated in April 2010 in the commemoration of the fiftieth anniversary of the creation of the Unified Socialist Party (PSU), the first step in the creation of the Socialist Tribune Institute, responsible for maintaining the intellectual heritage inherited from the PSU.

Jacques Sauvageot died on October 28, 2017 at the Pitié-Salpêtrière Hospital, following a traffic accident that occurred on September 12.

A tribute was paid to him on Thursday November 16, 2017, at the Père-Lachaise funeral home by his parents and friends. The lawyer Henri Leclerc eulogized him.

Works
May–June 1968, action guidelines. Brochure reserved for workers and students , foreword by Jacques Sauvageot, Paris, Au joli mai, 1968
The Student Revolt, the leaders speak , J. Sauvageot, A. Geismar, D. Cohn-Bendit; presentation of Hervé Bourges, Paris, Éd. du Seuil, 1968
Association Presse information jeunesse, La Presse à l'école , postface by Jacques Sauvageot, Paris, Éditions du Cerf, 1974
Monumental architecture and reconstruction , proceedings of the Rennes conference,December 1994, director of the publication Jacques Sauvageot, Rennes, Regional School of Fine Arts, 1995
Art schools in Europe , seminar on art education in Europe, introduction by Martial Gabillard and Jacques Sauvageot, Rennes, Regional School of Fine Arts, 2004
Carte blanche to Galerie Serge Le Borgne , catalog by François Perrodin, responsible for publication: Jacques Sauvageot, Rennes, École des beaux-arts, 2008
From built space to printed space , proceedings of the Rennes study day,November 2008, under the direction of Jacques Sauvageot, Rennes, School of Fine Arts, 2009
At the heart of the struggles of the sixties: PSU students: a utopia with a future? , work coordinated by Roger Barralis and Jean-Claude Gillet; introduction by Jacques Sauvageot, Paris, Publisud, 2010
The PSU: Ideas for a socialism of the XXI th century? , work edited by Jacques Sauvageot, ed. Rennes University Press, 2013
"L'UNEF et les frondes students", documentary film by Jean-Michel Rodrigo & Georges Terrier, directed by Jean-Michel Rodrigo. Co-production Mecanos Productions, INA, Telessonne, Atom, 2011.

Notes 

 
France
1968 in France
1968 labor disputes and strikes
1968 riots
Far-left politics